Mathys Saban (born 15 May 2002) is a French professional footballer who plays as a midfielder for  club Saint-Étienne.

Career 
A product of Torcy's youth academy, Saban joined the youth academy of Saint-Étienne in December 2016. On 5 June 2020, he signed his first professional contract keeping him at Saint-Étienne for three years. He made his professional debut with Saint-Étienne in a 1–0 Ligue 1 loss to Dijon on 23 May 2021, in the last game of the 2020–21 season.

References

External links
 
 ASSE Profile

2002 births
Living people
Footballers from Paris
French footballers
Association football midfielders
AS Saint-Étienne players
Ligue 1 players
Championnat National 2 players
Championnat National 3 players
French people of Guadeloupean descent